Accused, Stand Up! (French: Accusée, levez-vous!) is a 1930 French crime film directed by Maurice Tourneur and starring Gaby Morlay, Suzanne Delvé and Camille Bert. After the two female stars of a Parisian cabaret are seen arguing, one of them turns up dead. This leads to the arrest and trial of the other until the real culprit is caught.

The film's sets were designed by the art director Jacques Colombier.

Cast
 Gaby Morlay as Gaby Delange  
 Suzanne Delvé as Yvonne Delys  
 Camille Bert as Le Défenseur  
 Jean Dax as Désiré Larivière  
 André Dubosc as Le Président du Tribunal  
 Georges Paulais as L'Avocat Général  
 Alexandre Mihalesco as Le Concierge  
 André Roanne as André Darbois  
 Charles Vanel as Henri Lapalle 
 Raymond Aimos as Joueur de belote  
 Octave Berthier as Le caissier  
 Blanche Estival 
 Guy Favières as L'huissier aux Assises  
 Sola Fayarvay as Habilleuse noire  
 Fignolita as Habilleuse  
 Paul Franceschi as Flamberger, le vieil acteur  
 Jean-François Martial as Consommateur au musette  
 Gaston Mauger as Le directeur du théâtre Follies-Montmartre  
 André Nicolle as Docteur Louis 
 Jean Robert as Garde municipal  
 Nicole Rozan as Nénett

References

Bibliography 
 Waldman, Harry. Maurice Tourneur: The Life and Films. McFarland, 2001.

External links 
 

1930 films
French crime films
1930 crime films
1930s French-language films
Films directed by Maurice Tourneur
Films set in Paris
Pathé films
French black-and-white films
1930s French films